Sir John Lilborne (born 1341), of Milton Lilborne, Wiltshire was an English politician.

He was a Member (MP) of the Parliament of England for Wiltshire in 1395.

References

1341 births
Year of death missing
English MPs 1395
People from Wiltshire